The First Field Army was a designation used during the period of the United Arab Republic. It was based in Syria. During the period of the United Arab Republic, the army based in Syria was designated the First, and the other armies in Egypt the Second and Third. By 1973 any use of the 'First' designation in Syria had ended, but this did not stop erroneous Western press reporting that forces of the Central Military Region around Cairo were designated the First Army.

References

Field armies
United Arab Republic
Military units and formations of Egypt
Military units and formations of Syria